Isang Ugat, Isang Dugo (Filipino: "One Vein, One Blood") is the eighth studio album by Filipino rock band Rivermaya, released on October 13, 2006, through Viva Records. Except for original track "Isang Bandila (One Flag)", it is a covers album featuring songs by Filipino artists in the 1980s, including The Jerks, Joey Ayala, and Wuds.

Isang Ugat, Isang Dugo was the final album recorded featuring Rico Blanco as founding member and songwriter. "Isang Bandila" was used as the theme song for ABS-CBN's late-night television program Bandila from 2006 to 2018. 

The album went platinum in March 2007.

Track listing

Personnel 
 Rico Blanco – lead vocals, keyboards, guitar, synths
 Mark Escueta – drums, percussion, backing vocals, trumpet
 Mike Elgar – guitar, backing vocals
 Japs Sergio – bass

Additional musicians:
 Kitchie Nadal – additional vocals on "Ilog"
 Raimund Marasigan – additional vocals on "Inosente Lang Ang Nagtataka"
 Junji Lerma – additional guitars on "Sumigaw, Umawit Ka"

Album credits 
Executive Producers: Vic Del Rosario Jr. & Vincent Del Rosario
Album Producer: Rico Blanco
Supervising Producer: Marivic Benedicto
Associate Producer: Mally Paraguya
Coordinator: Raffy Lising
Album Design and Layout: Paolo Lim
Cover and Inside photos: Al Guerrero

Reference

External links
 Isang Ugat, Isang Dugo on Titik Pilipino: The Online Resource for Filipino Songs
Original Artists' Info

2006 albums
Rivermaya albums